Pesniary (also spelled Pesnyary) was a popular Soviet Belarusian folk rock VIA. It was founded in 1969 by guitarist Vladimir Mulyavin. Before 1970, the band was known under the name Liavony (Лявоны).

Style
Pesniary combined various types of music, but mostly Belarusian folklore though often with various rock elements and later rock as well. Several of Pesniary's songs were composed by Aleksandra Pakhmutova. The surprising influence of early Frank Zappa was also notable.

Biography
Pesniary was one of the very few Soviet bands (and possibly the first one) to tour in America in 1976. They toured the American South with folk band The New Christy Minstrels. 

After Mulyavin's death in a car accident on 26 January 2003, the original Pesniary split. About five different bands claim to be the official descendants of the original Pesniary and tour and perform original Pesniary songs. These are:

 Belarusian State Ensemble Pesniary – a state-produced band under the Ministry of Culture of Belarus, consisting mostly of young musicians.
 Belorusskie Pesniari – led by former Pesniary saxophonist Uladzislau Misevich.
 Pesniari – led by former Pesniary vocalist Leanid Bartkevich.
 Liavony – the band, which split from Bartkevich’s Pesniari in 2008, consisted of young musicians, none of whom participated in Pesniary until 1998.
 Until 2006, the Liavony-Pesniary ensemble existed under the direction of the classical line-up drummer Alexander Demeshko. The band broke up in 2006 in connection with his death.

Discography

The band also released dozens of singles.

Lineup
The lineup of the band changed frequently. Among the most notable and long-lived band members were:

Lyudmila Isupova (guitar, vocals,1968–2003)
Vladimir Mulyavin (guitar, vocals,1968–2003)
Valery Mulyavin (guitar, trumpet, 1968–1973)
Leonid Bortkevich (vocals, 1969–1980)
Anatoly Kasheparov (vocals, 1970–1990)
Valery Dayneka (vocals, alto, 1976–1992)
Igor Penya (vocals, 1980–1998)
Leonid Tyshko (bass guitar, 1968–1981)
Vladislav Misevich (saxophone, flute, 1968–1992)
Alexander Demeshko (drums, 1968–1988)
Valery Yashkin (keyboards, hurdy-gurdy, 1968–1977)
Vladimir Nikolayev (keyboards, trombone, 1971–1980)
Cheslav Poplavsky  (violin, guitar, 1972–1979)
Anna Bortkevich  guitar, 1972–1979)

See also
Soviet music
Belarusian music

References

External links 
“Pesnyary”- official website of the group (БЕЛОРУССКИЙ ГОСУДАРСТВЕННЫЙ АНСАМБЛЬ "ПЕСНЯРЫ"-официальный сайт
PESNIARY(PESNYARY)
Pesniary Music Albums
«Песняры»-unofficial website
 

Musical groups established in 1969
Musical groups disestablished in 2003
Belarusian folk music groups
Belarusian rock music groups
Soviet vocal-instrumental ensembles
Belarusian musical groups
Pop-folk music groups
Soviet rock music groups
1969 establishments in Belarus
2003 disestablishments in Belarus